U.S. Route 9 (US 9) is a United States Numbered Highway in the Northeastern U.S., running from Laurel, Delaware, north to Champlain, New York. In New Jersey, it runs from Cape May to Fort Lee northward.

In New Jersey, the route runs  from the Cape May–Lewes Ferry terminal in North Cape May, Cape May County, where the ferry carries US 9 across the Delaware Bay to Lewes, Delaware, north to the George Washington Bridge in Fort Lee, Bergen County, where the route along with Interstate 95 (I-95) and US 1 continue into New York City. US 9 is the longest U.S. Highway in the state. From North Cape May north to Toms River in Ocean County, US 9 is mostly a two-lane undivided road that closely parallels the Garden State Parkway and runs near the Jersey Shore. Along this stretch, it passes through the communities of Rio Grande, Cape May Court House, Somers Point, Pleasantville, Absecon, Tuckerton, Manahawkin, Beachwood, and Berkeley Township. In the Toms River area, US 9 runs along the Garden State Parkway for a short distance before heading northwest away from it and the Jersey Shore into Lakewood Township. Upon entering Monmouth County, the route transitions into a multilane suburban divided highway and continues through Howell Township, Freehold Township, Manalapan Township, Marlboro Township, Old Bridge Township, Sayreville, and South Amboy. In Woodbridge Township, US 9 merges with US 1 and the two routes continue through northern New Jersey as US 1/9 to the George Washington Bridge.

Prior to 1927, the current alignment of US 9 had been legislated as parts of several state highways, including Route 14 from Cape May to Seaville, Route 19 between Seaville and Absecon, Route 4 between Absecon and Lakewood and South Amboy and Rahway, Route 7 Spur between Lakewood and Freehold, and Route 1 between Rahway and Jersey City. US 9 was signed through New Jersey in 1926 to run from US 30 in Absecon north to the New York border in Alpine, where it became US 9W; it ran more to the east of its current alignment between Lakewood and South Amboy. In 1927, US 9 became Route 4 between Absecon and Lakewood and South Amboy and Rahway, Route 35 between Lakewood and Belmar and Eatontown and South Amboy (now Route 88 south of Point Pleasant), Route 4N (now Route 71) between Belmar and Eatontown, Route 27 between Rahway and Newark, Route 25 between Newark and Jersey City, and Route 1 north of Jersey City.

By the 1940s, US 9 had been extended south on Route 4 to Cape May and rerouted to current Route 4 between Lakewood and South Amboy. In addition, the route was moved to its current alignment between South Amboy and Jersey City, following Route 35 and Route 25, and routed to cross the Hudson River on the George Washington Bridge, using a part of Route 6. The state highway concurrencies were removed in 1953, and two realignments occurred to the route as a result of the construction of the Garden State Parkway in the 1950s. In the 1970s, US 9 was extended across the Cape May–Lewes Ferry to continue into Delaware with the former route into Cape May becoming Route 109. Also around this time, two freeways were proposed for US 9 in Atlantic and Monmouth counties but never built. The Beesley's Point Bridge over Great Egg Harbor Bay was closed in 2004, with US 9 rerouted to use the Great Egg Harbor Bridge along the Garden State Parkway.

Route description

Cape May County
From the Cape May Terminal of the Cape May–Lewes Ferry, which carries US 9 across the Delaware Bay to Lewes, Delaware, US 9 continues north on Ferry Road, a divided highway with one northbound lane and three southbound lanes which is under the maintenance of the Delaware River and Bay Authority. The road soon turns east and becomes four-lane divided Lincoln Boulevard. It runs between the residential community of North Cape May to the north and wetlands to the south within Lower Township, Cape May County. The road becomes Sandman Boulevard at the intersection with County Route 603 (CR 603), where it enters woodland and narrows into a two-lane undivided road. After a turn southeast, US 9 comes to a crossroads with CR 626, which heads south to cross the Cape May Canal as Route 162. After crossing the Cape May Seashore Lines railroad tracks, US 9 turns north onto Shore Road, while Route 109 continues straight to head into Cape May. Shore Road, which is maintained by the New Jersey Department of Transportation (NJDOT), carries the route northward through a mix of woods and marshland containing some development, with the Cape May Seashore Lines tracks running immediately to the west and the Garden State Parkway a short distance to the east. The road passes near Historic Cold Spring Village prior to a brief bend farther to the east of the railroad tracks as the route continues through Erma.

US 9 crosses into Middle Township, where it continues northeast into the commercial community of Rio Grande. Here, the road briefly widens to four lanes as it has an intersection with Route 47, which runs up the west bank of the cape. From this point, the two-lane route continues into a mix of woods and development. Heading into Burleigh, US 9 intersects Route 147 and CR 618. Route 147/CR 618, as well as Route 47, provide access to the Wildwoods resort area on the Jersey Shore. North of the Route 147 intersection, US 9 draws alongside the Garden State Parkway as it passes near the Wildwood Golf and Country Club. Shortly after pulling away from the Garden State Parkway once again, the highway continues into Cape May Court House, the county seat of Cape May County.

In this community, US 9 runs past a mix of homes and businesses, intersecting Shellbay Avenue and CR 657, both of which provide access to the Garden State Parkway at interchanges. At the CR 657 intersection, US 9 briefly gains a center left-turn lane and passes west of Cape Regional Medical Center. Upon leaving Cape May Court House, the route runs into more rural surroundings and comes to an intersection with CR 609, which heads east to an interchange with the Garden State Parkway, and Zoo Road, which heads west to the Cape May County Park & Zoo. Past here, the road again draws closer to the parkway and comes to a ramp that provides access to the southbound direction of the parkway. Continuing northeast through more wooded development, US 9 intersects CR 601 before entering Dennis Township.

A short distance later, in the community of Clermont, Route 83 splits off to the northwest. Past this intersection, US 9 continues northeast through more rural areas, reaching an intersection with CR 625 after passing by Magnolia Lake. Following the CR 625 intersection, the road comes to CR 550, which heads to the west. Not long after the CR 550 intersection, US 9 continues into Upper Township, where it passes rural development before reaching Seaville. Here, there is an intersection with the southern terminus of Route 50 and a ramp providing access to the southbound direction of the Garden State Parkway and from the northbound direction of the Garden State Parkway. At this intersection, the route is briefly a divided highway. Past this junction, the road continues northeast, where residential development becomes more constant alongside the road as it passes through Palermo.

US 9 reaches the community of Marmora, where it heads into commercial areas and briefly becomes a divided highway as it intersects CR 623. At this intersection, US 9 turns southeast to join CR 623 on Roosevelt Boulevard, while Shore Road continues north into Beesley's Point to a dead end at the site of the former Beesley's Point Bridge; this section of Shore Road is still inventoried as part of US 9 by NJDOT even though it no longer carries through traffic along US 9 since the bridge was closed and demolished. US 9/CR 623 runs southeast as five-lane road with a center left-turn lane that passes businesses. The road comes to an interchange with the Garden State Parkway, with a park-and-ride lot located within the northwest quadrant of the interchange. At this interchange, US 9 heads northeast on the four-lane limited-access parkway while CR 623 continues to Ocean City. The parkway, which has a wide median, carries the route through wooded areas between Beesley's Point to the west and marshland to the east. The median narrows as the highway comes to the Great Egg Harbor Bridge over the Great Egg Harbor Bay.

Atlantic County

The highway crosses the Great Egg Harbor Bay into Egg Harbor Township, Atlantic County, where it runs across marshy Drag Island into Somers Point before passing over the Drag Channel. The parkway has a southbound toll plaza before US 9 leaves the roadway at a partial interchange. Now called New Road, the route runs through developed areas prior to crossing CR 559. The road winds east through the Greate Bay Golf Club before turning north and intersecting the northern terminus of Route 52, a route leading to Ocean City, and West Laurel Drive, which provides access to and from the northbound Garden State Parkway. At this intersection, the road contains a median. From this point, the two-lane undivided US 9 is lined with businesses and continues northeast, gaining a center left-turn lane prior to the CR 559 Alternate (CR 559 Alt.) intersection. Here, the route enters Linwood and the turn lane ends as it heads through suburban areas. The road continues into Northfield, where it comes to CR 563. US 9 enters Pleasantville, intersecting US 40/US 322 (Black Horse Pike), a surface route to nearby Atlantic City to the east. The road turns more north-northeast past this intersection, crossing a trail and the Southern Railroad of New Jersey's Pleasantville Industrial Track line. The route reaches an interchange with the Atlantic City Expressway, the toll road leading into Atlantic City.

After this interchange, US 9 crosses CR 646 and enters Absecon. The route crosses the marshy Absecon Creek prior to passing businesses. After crossing under NJ Transit's Atlantic City Line, another route into Atlantic City, US 30 (White Horse Pike), intersects US 9. After US 30, the road turns east into wooded neighborhoods, becoming Wyoming Avenue. Route 157 intersects US 9 from the south, with US 9 making a left turn to head northeast onto Shore Road. The road continues into Galloway Township, with residential development becoming less dense as it runs a short distance to the west of inland bays, intersecting the southern terminus of CR 561.

Past this intersection, US 9 draws farther from the inland bays and becomes New York Road. The road continues through dense woodland with some residences prior to reaching Smithville. Here, the road crosses CR 561 Alt. Upon leaving the Smithville area, the land gets much more forested. The road turns slightly to the north-northwest as it crosses the marshy Nacote Creek, entering Port Republic and continuing north. After intersecting CR 575, the road passes a monument for the Battle of Chestnut Neck as it intersects Route 167. Following this intersection, US 9 turns west and merges onto the Garden State Parkway at an interchange. The limited-access parkway, which is six lanes wide, carries US 9 north through marshland to a crossing of the Mullica River.

Pine Barrens
This river crossing takes the two roads into Bass River Township, Burlington County, where US 9 merges off the Garden State Parkway. The route heads northwest onto two-lane undivided New York Road through woods, intersecting the northern terminus of the northern segment of Route 167. At this point, the route turns north and comes to a junction with CR 542. US 9 turns east into residential New Gretna before crossing under the Garden State Parkway without an interchange and passing over the marshy Bass River. This section runs along the eastern edge of the heavily forested Pine Barrens, with occasional areas of development.

The road crosses the Balanger Creek into Little Egg Harbor Township in Ocean County, where US 9 becomes an unnamed road. Continuing east, the roadway enters Tuckerton and passes more dense development and the Tuckerton Seaport as "Main Street". US 9 crosses the Tuckerton Creek near Pohatcong Lake prior to intersecting the southern terminus of CR 539. From this point, the road resumes a north-northeast bearing, passing more areas of the Pine Barrens as it continues back into Little Egg Harbor Township and runs through Parkertown. Upon entering Eagleswood Township, US 9 passes through the residential community of West Creek. Continuing into Stafford Township, the route reaches Manahawkin, where development increases. In Manahawkin, Route 72, the main route to Long Beach Island, meets US 9 at a cloverleaf interchange. In the vicinity of the interchange, the road is a four-lane divided highway.

After this interchange, the two-lane road passes more development before becoming more wooded. US 9 enters Barnegat Township, where it reaches the community of Barnegat, located a short distance to the west of the Barnegat Bay. In this community, there is an intersection with the eastern terminus of CR 554. Past this intersection, the route enters Ocean Township. In this area, US 9 comes to Waretown, where it intersects CR 532 in a commercial area. Leaving Waretown, the road heads north through areas of woodland and businesses before crossing the Oyster Creek into Lacey Township. Here, the road passes to the east of former Oyster Creek Nuclear Generating Station before crossing over a branch of the Forked River. At this point, US 9 runs past businesses in the community of Forked River, turning back to the north-northeast.

The land gets more built up as the road enters Lanoka Harbor. A crossing of the Cedar Creek takes the route into Berkeley Township and US 9 continues north as Atlantic City Boulevard.  At Bayville, the route is lined with businesses and makes a turn to the northwest. The road briefly forms the border between Berkeley Township to the southwest and Pine Beach to the northeast prior to crossing into Beachwood. In Beachwood, Route 166 heads north as the route widens into a four-lane divided highway. Past Route 166, US 9 turns more to the west past residential neighborhoods as a four-lane undivided road, entering South Toms River, where it widens into a divided highway. US 9 crosses CR 530 prior to merging onto the Garden State Parkway again at another interchange. At this interchange, the southbound direction of US 9 briefly runs concurrent with eastbound CR 530.

Toms River to Freehold

Joined with the eight-lane Garden State Parkway, US 9 briefly passes through Berkeley Township again before crossing the Toms River and entering the township of the same name. Here, the road reaches the exit for CR 527. Past CR 527, the road comes to a cloverleaf interchange with Route 37 at exit 82. US 9 leaves the Garden State Parkway again at the next exit, just before the Toms River Toll Plaza. At this point, the route intersects the northern terminus of Route 166 and heads north along Lakewood Road, a four-lane divided road that comes to an intersection with CR 571. Following this intersection, the road passes wooded suburban areas, turning more to the north-northwest. After a turn to the north, US 9 reaches an interchange with Route 70, a route connecting the northern part of the Jersey Shore to the Delaware Valley.

After this junction, the road takes the name River Avenue as it comes into Lakewood Township. Upon entering Lakewood Township, the road passes commercial establishments containing Monmouth Medical Center Southern Campus and running through tree-covered residential neighborhoods. After crossing the Southern Secondary railroad line operated by the Delaware and Raritan River Railroad, the road passes to the east of Lake Carasaljo as it intersects CR 528/CR 547. At this intersection, CR 547 forms a concurrency with US 9 and the two routes continue north on Madison Avenue, crossing the Metedeconk River, which Lake Carasaljo is formed from. After intersecting the western terminus of Route 88, Madison Avenue continues north through the commercial and residential center of Lakewood as a four-lane undivided road, with CR 547 splitting from US 9 by turning east. Entering a business area, the route crosses CR 526, turning into a divided highway called the Lila W. Thompson Memorial Highway.

US 9 enters Howell Township, Monmouth County, at the point where it crosses over the North Branch Metedeconk River. The road runs north, lined with businesses and shopping centers as it has several intersections with jughandles. In this area, the route reaches an interchange with I-195, where US 9 begins a northwestward slant. After this interchange, the highway continues north and passes west of the Howell Park & Ride, with a bus stop next to the northbound lanes serving NJ Transit busses. Past here, the highway enters Freehold Township, where it crosses CR 524.

Freehold to US 1
After entering into Freehold Township, the route turns north and has an intersection with Route 79 before the interchange with the Route 33 freeway. Following Route 33, the highway continues northwest and passes southwest of the Freehold Mall, where a park-and-ride lot is located. The route enters Freehold Borough, the county seat of Monmouth County, as it has an interchange with CR 537. US 9 enters Freehold Township again as it passes between Freehold Raceway Mall to the west and Freehold Raceway to the east. The route turns north, widens to eight lanes, and intersects Route 33 Business (Route 33 Bus.) at former Freehold Circle. From this point, US 9 runs west of Freehold Borough and east of Monmouth Battlefield State Park, as a six-lane highway before crossing over the Freehold Secondary railroad line operated by the Delaware and Raritan River Railroad and CR 522, with ramps providing access to the latter. After this interchange, the highway narrows back to four lanes and intersects Schibanoff Lane, which leads west to the Freehold Township Commuter Lot. The route enters Manalapan Township immediately after the Craig Road/East Freehold Road intersection, with a park-and-ride lot situated northwest of the intersection in a shopping center. In Manalapan Township, US 9 runs through more suburban areas and passes to the east of the Manalapan EpiCentre big-box complex. The road crosses Symmes Drive/Ryan Road, where a park-and-ride lot is located on the northwest corner. US 9 reaches an interchange with CR 3 before passing a mix of farmland and development as it crosses into Marlboro Township. In Marlboro Township, businesses predominate the road as it reaches an interchange with Union Hill Road. Following this, US 9 continues north and crosses CR 520.

The road enters Old Bridge Township, Middlesex County, where it becomes the Joann H. Smith Memorial Highway and interchanges with the Route 18 freeway. Within this interchange, the travel lanes of US 9 split. From Route 18, the route widens to six lanes as it eventually comes to interchanges with Throckmorton Lane/Ticetown Road and CR 516. Past CR 516, the highway passes a mix of woodland and farm fields and crosses Jake Brown Road, where a park-and-ride lot is located on the northeast corner of the intersection. Route 34 intersects US 9 at a directional interchange, with access from southbound US 9 to southbound Route 34 and from northbound Route 34 to northbound US 9. Missing movements between northbound Route 34 and southbound US 9 and northbound US 9 and southbound Route 34 are provided by Perrine Road to the south. From Route 34 through to the US 1/9 concurrency in Avenel, there are no jughandles or other intersections, just right-in/right-out access and interchanges. Past Route 34, the highway continues past the Old Bridge Park & Ride, with a bus terminal next to the northbound lanes serving NJ Transit busses, and several shopping centers, with a southbound exit and entrance serving the park-and-ride and one of the shopping centers. US 9 enters Sayreville, where it passes more suburban areas, interchanging with CR 673 and CR 615. A short distance after the latter, the road comes to a partial interchange with the Garden State Parkway at exit 123; this interchange only has access from the Parkway southbound to US 9 south and from US 9 north to the northbound parkway. US 9 narrows to four lanes past this interchange and runs northeast as it enters South Amboy. The route comes to an interchange with Route 35, merging onto that route for a concurrency.

The concurrent US 9 and Route 35 head northwest on a four-lane divided highway through commercial areas and woodland, crossing over Conrail Shared Assets Operations (CSAO)'s Amboy Secondary before turning north and interchanging with CR 535 (Raritan Street) and Kearney Road, crossing back into Sayreville at the interchange with the former. At this point, the road widens to six lanes. The two routes split at an interchange (the former Victory Circle) that has access to the southbound Garden State Parkway and from the northbound Parkway by way of Chevalier Avenue. From here, US 9 closely parallels the east side of the Garden State Parkway as it crosses the Raritan River on the Edison Bridge, with the parkway crossing the river on the Driscoll Bridge. Upon crossing the Raritan River, US 9 enters Woodbridge Township, where it reaches a complex interchange with the Garden State Parkway, the Route 440 freeway, and CR 656. Within this interchange, the Garden State Parkway's travel lanes run in between the travel lanes of US 9, with this configuration continuing past the interchange for a short distance. Along this stretch, the road passes under CSAO's Perth Amboy Running Track line and there are ramps to and from CR 616 and to the parkway and the New Jersey Turnpike (I-95).

After US 9 heads east away from the parkway, it reaches a cloverleaf interchange with Route 184/CR 501 and continues into a business district. A short distance later, the highway crosses over the access road between the Garden State Parkway and the New Jersey Turnpike just east of the toll plaza and then the New Jersey Turnpike itself. From this point, the highway passes several office parks, reaching an interchange with CR 514. After CR 514, the route passes some residential neighborhoods before passing to the east of the Woodbridge Center shopping mall. After passing under CSAO's Port Reading Secondary line, US 9 junctions with CR 604 prior to merging with US 1.

US 1/9 concurrency

US 1 and US 9 become concurrent upon merging in Woodbridge Township and continue through developed areas, interchanging with Route 35. Soon after this interchange, jughandles and other traffic light-controlled intersections resume. Upon entering Union County, US 1/9 pass through Rahway and Linden, interchanging with I-278 in Linden. The road continues into urban Elizabeth, crossing Route 439 before turning into a freeway prior to meeting Route 81 near Newark Liberty International Airport. US 1/9 continue along the west end of the airport into Newark, Essex County, reaching the Newark Airport Interchange with I-78, US 22, and Route 21. From this interchange, the road continues northeast through industrial areas to an interchange with US 1/9 Truck that provides access to the New Jersey Turnpike (I-95).

US 1/9 continue onto the Pulaski Skyway, which carries the route over the Passaic River into Hudson County, crossing over Kearny and the Hackensack River before coming into Jersey City. Trucks are banned from the Pulaski Skyway and must use US 1/9 Truck to bypass it.

The Pulaski Skyway ends at the Tonnele Circle with US 1/9 Truck and Route 139, and US 1/9 continue north along at-grade Tonnelle Avenue toward North Bergen, where the road intersects Route 3 and Route 495. Crossing into Bergen County, Broad Avenue carries US 1/9 through Fairview and Ridgefield before heading into Palisades Park. Here, the two routes join US 46, and the combined road heads north into Fort Lee. US 1/9/US 46 come to an interchange with I-95, US 9W, and Route 4, where it joins I-95 to head east to the George Washington Bridge over the Hudson River. At this point, US 46 ends and I-95 and US 1/9 continue into Manhattan, New York City on the Trans-Manhattan Expressway.

Route 9 BBS

The Route 9 BBS, or bus bypass shoulder, are a part of the express bus system in Monmouth and Middlesex counties. The road is used by NJ Transit's routes 63, 64, 67 to Hudson County, the 130, 132, 136, 139 to the Port Authority Bus Terminal, and Academy Bus Lines to Lower Manhattan. An extensive analysis by consulting and planning firm Stantec released in 2010 includes recommendations regarding design, construction, and implementation of the BBS extension. The second phase of the project would start at the project's southern end near Lakewood Terminal near Route 88. The third phase and final phase would connect the northern and southern segments passing through Freehold Township and proximate towns, where work would include some widening and deepening of the roadbed to handle bus traffic.

History

What would become US 9 was originally part of a Lenape trail running from the Great Navesink Trail down to what is now Cape May. The section of the road between Nacote Creek in Port Republic and Somers Point, called Shore Road, was first laid out in 1731 to replace an earlier road along the coast of that area. South of Cape May Courthouse, the road was part of the Cape May Turnpike, which also included parts of Seashore Drive and Route 109. Later, the road from Cape May to Toms River would become part of the Jersey Coast Way, stretching from Cape May to the Staten Island Ferry. The road was legislated as part of several state routes in the 1910s and 1920s. Between Cape May and Seaville, the road was legislated as part of Route 14 in 1917. Route 19 was designated to run along the current route between Seaville and Absecon but was never built. From Absecon north to Lakewood, and from South Amboy to Rahway, Route 4 was designated in 1916 along the current route.  Between Lakewood and Freehold, Route 7 Spur, created in 1925, was to run on the present US 9 alignment. Between Rahway and Elizabeth, Route 1 was created in 1916; an extension north to the Holland Tunnel was planned in 1922.

When the U.S. Numbered Highway System was created in 1926, US 9 was designated in New Jersey to run from US 30 in Absecon north to the New York border in Alpine, where it continued into New York as US 9W. In New Jersey, the route followed the entirety of Route 4 between Absecon and Rahway, bending farther to the east of its current alignment between Lakewood and South Amboy by running closer to the Atlantic Ocean. In Rahway, US 9 joined US 1 and Route 1 for a concurrency north toward Newark. Past Newark, the road followed current US 1/9 Truck toward Jersey City, where US 1 and US 9 split. At this point, US 9 continued north on its current alignment in Fort Lee, where it then ran north on present-day CR 501 toward the New York border. US 9 was designated along this alignment to the New York border as the original numbering plans called for it to continue up the west bank of the Hudson River to Albany, New York, with US 109 running along the east bank of the river. However, it was instead split into two suffixed routes in New York, with US 9W running along the west bank and US 9E running along the east bank, New Jersey had kept its alignment of US 9 to US 9W at the border in Alpine.

In the 1927 New Jersey state highway renumbering, the present-day routing of US 9 between Cape May and Woodbridge became part of Route 4, while the portion along the US 1/9 concurrency south of the Tonnele Circle became part of Route 25 and north of there to the George Washington Bridge became Route 1 and Route 6. Meanwhile, what had been signed as US 9 at the time was Route 4 from Absecon to Lakewood, Route 35 between Lakewood and Belmar and Eatontown and South Amboy (now Route 88 between Lakewood and Point Pleasant), Route 4N (now Route 71) between Belmar and Eatontown, Route 4 (now Route 35) between South Amboy and Rahway, Route 27 between Rahway and Newark, Route 25 between Newark and Jersey City, and Route 1 north of Jersey City. After the Pulaski Skyway opened in 1932, US 9, along with US 1 and Route 25, was routed onto it. By the 1940s, US 9 was extended south along Route 4 to Cape May, with the small southern piece leading to US 30 in Absecon becoming an unnumbered road that is now Route 157. In addition, US 9 was moved to its current routing between South Amboy and the George Washington Bridge. By 1947, US 9 and Route 4 were moved to a new alignment between Freehold and Old Bridge Township, with the old alignment becoming Route 4A (now Route 79 and a part of Route 34).

In the 1953 New Jersey state highway renumbering, the state highways running concurrent with US 9 were removed. In addition, US 1/9 Truck was created as a truck bypass of the Pulaski Skyway, replacing Route 25T, and US 1/9 Bus. (now Route 139) was signed along the former Route 25 approach to the Holland Tunnel. After the Garden State Parkway was completed through the Toms River area in 1954, US 9 was moved to it to bypass the center of the community and the former route became US 9 Alt. (now Route 166). Also in 1954, a new bridge for the Garden State Parkway was built over the Mullica River at the site of the US 9 bridge; the old bridge carrying US 9 was dismantled, and the route was designated to follow the Garden State Parkway over the Mullica River from two interchanges. The approaches to the former bridge became Route 167.

In the mid-1960s, a limited-access toll road called the Garden State Thruway was planned along the US 9 alignment between Toms River and Woodbridge. This freeway was intended to serve all vehicles and provide a shortcut to the Garden State Parkway and US 9 through central New Jersey but was never built. In the early 1970s, another plan surfaced for a US 9 freeway from Route 34 in Madison Township (now Old Bridge Township) north to Route 35 in Sayreville. The freeway, which was to cost $17 million (equivalent to $ in ), was not built due to financial problems. A freeway was also proposed for US 9 in Atlantic County in the late 1960s, running from the proposed Route 60 freeway in Somers Point to CR 575 in Smithville. This freeway, which was to cost $35 million (equivalent to $ in ) and intended to alleviate traffic on the current US 9 and the Garden State Parkway, was also never built due to financial and environmental issues.

In 1972, US 9 was relocated from its southern terminus in Cape May to head west to the Cape May–Lewes Ferry terminal in North Cape May, with the former route into Cape May becoming Route 109. US 9 was extended across the ferry to US 13 in Laurel, Delaware, in 1974. In 2001, a new span was added to the Edison Bridge over the Raritan River in a $60-million (equivalent to $ in ) project. The Victory Circle at the north end of the Route 35 concurrency in Sayreville was replaced with an interchange between 2003 and 2006.

The Beesley's Point Bridge over the Great Egg Harbor was closed to traffic in 2004 because of a crumbling deck, with the bridge owner, the Beesley's Point Bridge Company, unable to fund repairs. US 9 was detoured around the closure on the Garden State Parkway. In 2008, Cape May County acquired the bridge from the Beesley's Point Bridge Company and planned to restore it by 2012, with an estimated cost of $20 million (equivalent to $ in ). However, the Beesley's Point Bridge was slated to be demolished in 2013 as part of a project that will also replace the Great Egg Harbor Bridge. As of 2011, a $588-million (equivalent to $ in ) project for expansion of the  segment of US 9 between Toms River and Lakewood was in a "design concept" phase with funding earmarked for 2016–2017 construction.

In popular culture
US 9 in New Jersey is prominently referenced in the lyrics of the Bruce Springsteen song "Born to Run" in the lyrics, "Sprung from cages on Highway 9 / Chrome wheeled, fuel injected and steppin' out over the line".

Major intersections

Related routes
There is one remaining bannered spur of US 9 in the state of New Jersey:
U.S. Route 1/9 Truck in Jersey City

The following state highways were also formerly designated as bannered spurs of US 9:
Route 139 in Jersey City was formerly U.S. Route 1/9 Business
Route 166 in Toms River was formerly U.S. Route 9 Alternate

Additionally, the following state highways are former alignments of US 9:
Route 109 in Cape May
Route 157 in Absecon
Route 167 near Bass River

See also

References

External links

Speed Limits for Route 9

Garden State Parkway
Limited-access roads in New Jersey
Transportation in Atlantic County, New Jersey
Transportation in Bergen County, New Jersey
Transportation in Burlington County, New Jersey
Transportation in Cape May County, New Jersey
Transportation in Essex County, New Jersey
Transportation in Hudson County, New Jersey
Transportation in Middlesex County, New Jersey
Transportation in Monmouth County, New Jersey
Transportation in Ocean County, New Jersey
Transportation in Union County, New Jersey
Transportation in the Pine Barrens (New Jersey)
09